Łukasz Wójcik is a Polish glider pilot, runner-up in 2012 world gliding championships in 18m class and the runner-up in the Standard Class in 2013 European Championships. He had also won 2008 Polish national championships and placed second in 2009 European.

Major titles

References

Polish glider pilots
Living people
Polish aviators
Place of birth missing (living people)
Year of birth missing (living people)